Eumelea rosalia is a species of moth of the family Geometridae described by Caspar Stoll in 1781. It is found from the Indo-Australian tropics of India, Sri Lanka, Myanmar, east to northern Australia and New Caledonia.

Description

The males are generally rather redder than the females. The wingspan of the male is about 50 mm and the female 60 mm. Body bright yellow thickly irrorated with crimson. Forewings with indistinct antemedial, medial and submarginal crimson bands. Hindwings with medial and submarginal bands. Ventral side is with more prominent crimson bands.

Larvae have been recorded on Mallotus and Clinostigma species.

References

External links
Final instar caterpillar and metamorphosis of Eumelea ludovicata

Desmobathrinae